A semitone, also called a half step or a half tone, is the smallest musical interval commonly used in Western tonal music, and it is considered the most dissonant when sounded harmonically.
It is defined as the interval between two adjacent notes in a 12-tone scale. For example, C is adjacent to C; the interval between them is a semitone.

In a 12-note approximately equally divided scale, any interval can be defined in terms of an appropriate number of semitones (e.g. a whole tone or major second is 2 semitones wide, a major third 4 semitones, and a perfect fifth 7 semitones.

In music theory, a distinction is made between a diatonic semitone, or minor second (an interval encompassing two different staff positions, e.g. from C to D) and a chromatic semitone or augmented unison (an interval between two notes at the same staff position, e.g. from C to C). These are enharmonically equivalent when twelve-tone equal temperament is used, but are not the same thing in meantone temperament, where the diatonic semitone is distinguished from and smaller than the chromatic semitone (augmented unison). See  for more details about this terminology.

In twelve-tone equal temperament all semitones are equal in size (100 cents). In other tuning systems, "semitone" refers to a family of intervals that may vary both in size and name. In Pythagorean tuning, seven semitones out of twelve are diatonic, with ratio 256:243 or 90.2 cents (Pythagorean limma), and the other five are chromatic, with ratio 2187:2048 or 113.7 cents (Pythagorean apotome); they differ by the Pythagorean comma of ratio 531441:524288 or 23.5 cents. In quarter-comma meantone, seven of them are diatonic, and 117.1 cents wide, while the other five are chromatic, and 76.0 cents wide; they differ by the lesser diesis of ratio 128:125 or 41.1 cents. 12-tone scales tuned in just intonation typically define three or four kinds of semitones. For instance, Asymmetric five-limit tuning yields chromatic semitones with ratios 25:24 (70.7 cents) and 135:128 (92.2 cents), and diatonic semitones with ratios 16:15 (111.7 cents) and 27:25 (133.2 cents). For further details, see below.

The condition of having semitones is called hemitonia; that of having no semitones is anhemitonia. A musical scale or chord containing semitones is called hemitonic; one without semitones is anhemitonic.

Minor second

The minor second occurs in the major scale, between the third and fourth degree, (mi (E) and fa (F) in C major), and between the seventh and eighth degree (ti (B) and do (C) in C major). It is also called the diatonic semitone because it occurs between steps in the diatonic scale. The minor second is abbreviated m2 (or −2). Its inversion is the major seventh (M7 or Ma7).

. Here, middle C is followed by D, which is a tone 100 cents sharper than C, and then by both tones together.

Melodically, this interval is very frequently used, and is of particular importance in cadences. In the perfect and deceptive cadences it appears as a resolution of the leading-tone to the tonic. In the plagal cadence, it appears as the falling of the subdominant to the mediant. It also occurs in many forms of the imperfect cadence, wherever the tonic falls to the leading-tone.

Harmonically, the interval usually occurs as some form of dissonance or a nonchord tone that is not part of the functional harmony. It may also appear in inversions of a major seventh chord, and in many added tone chords.

In unusual situations, the minor second can add a great deal of character to the music. For instance, Frédéric Chopin's Étude Op. 25, No. 5 opens with a melody accompanied by a line that plays fleeting minor seconds. These are used to humorous and whimsical effect, which contrasts with its more lyrical middle section. This eccentric dissonance has earned the piece its nickname: the "wrong note" étude. This kind of usage of the minor second appears in many other works of the Romantic period, such as Modest Mussorgsky's Ballet of the Unhatched Chicks. More recently, the music to the movie Jaws exemplifies the minor second.

In other temperaments
In just intonation a 16:15 minor second arises in the C major scale between B & C and E & F, and is, "the sharpest dissonance found in the [major] scale."

Augmented unison

The augmented unison, the interval produced by the augmentation, or widening by one half step, of the perfect unison, does not occur between diatonic scale steps, but instead between a scale step and a chromatic alteration of the same step. It is also called a chromatic semitone. The augmented unison is abbreviated A1, or aug 1. Its inversion is the diminished octave (d8, or dim 8). The augmented unison is also the inversion of the augmented octave, because the interval of the diminished unison does not exist. This is because a unison is always made larger when one note of the interval is changed with an accidental.

Melodically, an augmented unison very frequently occurs when proceeding to a chromatic chord, such as a secondary dominant, a diminished seventh chord, or an augmented sixth chord. Its use is also often the consequence of a melody proceeding in semitones, regardless of harmonic underpinning, e.g. D, D, E, F, F. (Restricting the notation to only minor seconds is impractical, as the same example would have a rapidly increasing number of accidentals, written enharmonically as D, E, F, G, A).

Harmonically, augmented unisons are quite rare in tonal repertoire. In the example to the right, Liszt had written an E against an E in the bass. Here E was preferred to a D to make the tone's function clear as part of an F dominant seventh chord, and the augmented unison is the result of superimposing this harmony upon an E pedal point.

In addition to this kind of usage, harmonic augmented unisons are frequently written in modern works involving tone clusters, such as Iannis Xenakis' Evryali for piano solo.

History

The semitone appeared in the music theory of Greek antiquity as part of a diatonic or chromatic tetrachord, and it has always had a place in the diatonic scales of Western music since. The various modal scales of medieval music theory were all based upon this diatonic pattern of tones and semitones.

Though it would later become an integral part of the musical cadence, in the early polyphony of the 11th century this was not the case. Guido of Arezzo suggested instead in his Micrologus other alternatives: either proceeding by whole tone from a major second to a unison, or an occursus having two notes at a major third move by contrary motion toward a unison, each having moved a whole tone.

"As late as the 13th century the half step was experienced as a problematic interval not easily understood, as the irrational  remainder between the perfect fourth and the ditone ." In a melodic half step, no "tendency was perceived of the lower tone toward the upper, or of the upper toward the lower. The second tone was not taken to be the ‘goal’ of the first. Instead, the half step was avoided in clausulae because it lacked clarity as an interval."

However, beginning in the 13th century cadences begin to require motion in one voice by half step and the other a whole step in contrary motion. These cadences would become a fundamental part of the musical language, even to the point where the usual accidental accompanying the minor second in a cadence was often omitted from the written score (a practice known as musica ficta). By the 16th century, the semitone had become a more versatile interval, sometimes even appearing as an augmented unison in very chromatic passages. Semantically, in the 16th century the repeated melodic semitone became associated with weeping, see: passus duriusculus, lament bass, and pianto.

By the Baroque era (1600 to 1750), the tonal harmonic framework was fully formed, and the various musical functions of the semitone were rigorously understood. Later in this period the adoption of well temperaments for instrumental tuning and the more frequent use of enharmonic equivalences increased the ease with which a semitone could be applied. Its function remained similar through the Classical period, and though it was used more frequently as the language of tonality became more chromatic in the Romantic period, the musical function of the semitone did not change.

In the 20th century, however, composers such as Arnold Schoenberg, Béla Bartók, and Igor Stravinsky sought alternatives or extensions of tonal harmony, and found other uses for the semitone. Often the semitone was exploited harmonically as a caustic dissonance, having no resolution. Some composers would even use large collections of harmonic semitones (tone clusters) as a source of cacophony in their music (e.g. the early piano works of Henry Cowell). By now, enharmonic equivalence was a commonplace property of equal temperament, and instrumental use of the semitone was not at all problematic for the performer. The composer was free to write semitones wherever he wished.

Semitones in different tunings

The exact size of a semitone depends on the tuning system used. Meantone temperaments have two distinct types of semitones, but in the exceptional case of equal temperament, there is only one. The unevenly distributed well temperaments contain many different semitones. Pythagorean tuning, similar to meantone tuning, has two, but in other systems of just intonation there are many more possibilities.

Meantone temperament

In meantone systems, there are two different semitones. This results because of the break in the circle of fifths that occurs in the tuning system: diatonic semitones derive from a chain of five fifths that does not cross the break, and chromatic semitones come from one that does.

The chromatic semitone is usually smaller than the diatonic. In the common quarter-comma meantone, tuned as a cycle of tempered fifths from E to G, the chromatic and diatonic semitones are 76.0 and 117.1 cents wide respectively.

Extended meantone temperaments with more than 12 notes still retain the same two semitone sizes, but there is more flexibility for the musician about whether to use an augmented unison or minor second. 31-tone equal temperament is the most flexible of these, which makes an unbroken circle of 31 fifths, allowing the choice of semitone to be made for any pitch.

Equal temperament

12-tone equal temperament is a form of meantone tuning in which the diatonic and chromatic semitones are exactly the same, because its circle of fifths has no break. Each semitone is equal to one twelfth of an octave. This is a ratio of 21/12 (approximately 1.05946), or 100 cents, and is 11.7 cents narrower than the 16:15 ratio (its most common form in just intonation, discussed below).

All diatonic intervals can be expressed as an equivalent number of semitones. For instance a whole tone equals two semitones.

There are many approximations, rational or otherwise, to the equal-tempered semitone. To cite a few:
suggested by Vincenzo Galilei and used by luthiers of the Renaissance,

suggested by Marin Mersenne as a constructible and more accurate alternative,

used by Julián Carrillo as part of a sixteenth-tone system.

For more examples, see Pythagorean and Just systems of tuning below.

Well temperament
There are many forms of well temperament, but the characteristic they all share is that their semitones are of an uneven size. Every semitone in a well temperament has its own interval (usually close to the equal-tempered version of 100 cents), and there is no clear distinction between a diatonic and chromatic semitone in the tuning. Well temperament was constructed so that enharmonic equivalence could be assumed between all of these semitones, and whether they were written as a minor second or augmented unison did not effect a different sound. Instead, in these systems, each key had a slightly different sonic color or character, beyond the limitations of conventional notation.

Pythagorean tuning

Like meantone temperament, Pythagorean tuning is a broken circle of fifths. This creates two distinct semitones, but because Pythagorean tuning is also a form of 3-limit just intonation, these semitones are rational. Also, unlike most meantone temperaments, the chromatic semitone is larger than the diatonic.

The Pythagorean diatonic semitone has a ratio of 256/243, and is often called the Pythagorean limma. It is also sometimes called the Pythagorean minor semitone. It is about 90.2 cents.

It can be thought of as the difference between three octaves and five just fifths, and functions as a diatonic semitone in a Pythagorean tuning.

The Pythagorean chromatic semitone has a ratio of 2187/2048. It is about 113.7 cents. It may also be called the Pythagorean apotome or the Pythagorean major semitone. (See Pythagorean interval.)

It can be thought of as the difference between four perfect octaves and seven just fifths, and functions as a chromatic semitone in a Pythagorean tuning.

The Pythagorean limma and Pythagorean apotome are enharmonic equivalents (chromatic semitones) and only a Pythagorean comma apart, in contrast to diatonic and chromatic semitones in meantone temperament and 5-limit just intonation.

Just 5-limit intonation 

A minor second in just intonation typically corresponds to a pitch ratio of 16:15 or 1.0666... (approximately 111.7 cents), called the just diatonic semitone. This is a practical just semitone, since it is the difference between a perfect fourth and major third.

The 16:15 just minor second arises in the C major scale between B & C and E & F, and is, "the sharpest dissonance found in the scale."

An augmented unison in just intonation is another semitone of 25:24 or 1.0416... (approximately 70.7 cents). It is the difference between a 5:4 major third and a 6:5 minor third. Composer Ben Johnston uses a sharp to indicate a note is raised 70.7 cents, or a flat to indicate a note is lowered 70.7 cents.

Two other kinds of semitones are produced by 5-limit tuning. A chromatic scale defines 12 semitones as the 12 intervals between the 13 adjacent notes forming a full octave (e.g. from C4 to C5). The 12 semitones produced by a commonly used version of 5-limit tuning have four different sizes, and can be classified as follows:

Just, or smaller, or minor, chromatic semitone, e.g. between E and E (6/5 and 5/4):
 
Larger, or major, chromatic semitone, or larger limma, or major chroma, e.g. between C and C (1/1 and 135/128):
 
Just, or smaller, or minor, diatonic semitone, e.g. between C and D (1/1 and 16/15):
 
Larger, or major, diatonic semitone, e.g. between A and B (5/3 and 16/9):
 

The most frequently occurring semitones are the just ones (S3 and S1): S3 occurs six times out of 12, S1 three times, S2 twice, and S4 only once.

The smaller chromatic and diatonic semitones differ from the larger by the syntonic comma (81:80 or 21.5 cents). The smaller and larger chromatic semitones differ from the respective diatonic semitones by the same 128:125 diesis as the above meantone semitones. Finally, while the inner semitones differ by the diaschisma (2048:2025 or 19.6 cents), the outer differ by the greater diesis (648:625 or 62.6 cents).

Extended just intonations
In 7-limit there is the septimal diatonic semitone of 15:14 available between the 5-limit major seventh (15:8) and the 7-limit minor seventh (7:4). There is also a smaller septimal chromatic semitone of 21:20 between a septimal minor seventh and a fifth (21:8) and an octave and a major third (5:2). Both are more rarely used than their 5-limit neighbours, although the former was often implemented by theorist Henry Cowell, while Harry Partch used the latter as part of his 43-tone scale.

Under 11-limit tuning, there is a fairly common undecimal neutral second (12:11), but it lies on the boundary between the minor and major second (150.6 cents). In just intonation there are infinitely many possibilities for intervals that fall within the range of the semitone (e.g. the Pythagorean semitones mentioned above), but most of them are impractical.

In 13-limit tuning, there is a tridecimal 2/3 tone (13:12 or 138.57 cents) and tridecimal 1/3 tone (27:26 or 65.34 cents).

In 17-limit just intonation, the major diatonic semitone is 15:14 or 119.4 cents, and the minor diatonic semitone is 17:16 or 105.0 cents, and septendecimal limma is 18:17 or 98.95 cents.

Though the names diatonic and chromatic are often used for these intervals, their musical function is not the same as the two meantone semitones. For instance, 15:14 would usually be written as an augmented unison, functioning as the chromatic counterpart to a diatonic 16:15. These distinctions are highly dependent on the musical context, and just intonation is not particularly well suited to chromatic usage (diatonic semitone function is more prevalent).

Other equal temperaments

19-tone equal temperament distinguishes between the chromatic and diatonic semitones; in this tuning, the chromatic semitone is one step of the scale, and the diatonic semitone is two. 31-tone equal temperament also distinguishes between these two intervals, which become 2 and 3 steps of the scale, respectively. 53-ET has an even closer match to the two semitones with 3 and 5 steps of its scale while 72-ET uses 4 and 7 steps of its scale.

In general, because the smaller semitone can be viewed as the difference between a minor third and a major third, and the larger as the difference between a major third and a perfect fourth, tuning systems that closely match those just intervals (6/5, 5/4, and 4/3) will also distinguish between the two types of semitones and closely match their just intervals (25/24 and 16/15).

See also

List of meantone intervals
 List of musical intervals
 List of pitch intervals
Approach chord
Major second
Neutral second
Pythagorean interval
Regular temperament

References

Further reading

Grout, Donald Jay, and Claude V. Palisca. A History of Western Music, 6th ed. New York: Norton, 2001. .
Hoppin, Richard H. Medieval Music. New York: W. W. Norton, 1978. .

Minor intervals
Seconds (music)